Mateja Šimic (born 11 March 1980) is a Slovenian triathlete. She competed in the Women's event at the 2012 Summer Olympics.

References

1980 births
Living people
Slovenian female triathletes
Olympic triathletes of Slovenia
Triathletes at the 2012 Summer Olympics
Triathletes at the 2016 Summer Olympics
Sportspeople from Ljubljana
20th-century Slovenian women
21st-century Slovenian women